S. K. M. Maeilanandhan, is an Indian industrialist and founder of S. K. M. Group of companies. He was honoured by the Government of India, in 2013, by bestowing on him the Padma Shri, the fourth highest civilian award, for his contributions to the field of social service.

Biography

S. K. M. Maeilanandhan was born as S. K. Mayilsamy Gounder, a name he discarded to take up the present one, in 1945, in a small hamlet, Modakurichi, near Erode, an inland commercial city in the south Indian state of Tamil Nadu, in a Kongu Vellalar agricultural family. Choosing not to pursue a farming career, Maeilanandhan opened a small general store in Erode in 1966, which over the years, grew into a  5 billion business group, with diverse activities covering poultry farming, Ayurveda medicines, fertilizer distribution, animal feeds and marketing and composed of:
 SKM Egg Products Export India Ltd
 SKM Animal Feeds and Foods
 SKM Siddha and Ayurvedic Medicines India Pvt Ltd
 SKM Health and Mind Welfare Charity Trust

The business activities of SKM Group is presently handled by his two sons and Maeilanandhan devotes his time to social service and attends to his duties as the President of the World Community Service Centre (WCSC) founded by Vethathiri Maharishi, a non profit spiritual organization, attempting to spread the message of yoga and meditation to the villages. The organization conducts programmes covering 15 village panchayats. The charitable trust he founded in 1989, SKM Health and Mind Welfare Charity Trust, 
has adopted two dalit villages,  Gandhi Nagar and Rajiv Nagar in Saminathapuram, and support them.

In 2013, the Government of India honoured S. K. M. Maeilanandhan with the fourth highest civilian award, Padma Shri.

References

External links
 

1945 births
Living people
Recipients of the Padma Shri in social work
People from Erode district
Indian industrialists
Businesspeople from Tamil Nadu